Donald Trump, the president of the United States from 2017 to 2021, has been accused of rape, sexual assault, and sexual harassment, including non-consensual kissing or groping, by at least 25 women since the 1970s. The accusations have resulted in three instances of litigation: his then-wife Ivana made a rape claim during their 1989 divorce litigation but later recanted that claim; businesswoman Jill Harth sued Trump in 1997 alleging breach of contract while also suing for sexual harassment but agreed to forfeit her sexual harassment claim as part of a settlement she received relating to the former suit; and, in 2017, former The Apprentice contestant Summer Zervos filed a defamation lawsuit after Trump accused her of lying about her sexual misconduct allegations against him.

Two of the allegations (by Ivana Trump and Jill Harth) became public before Trump's candidacy for president, but the rest arose after a 2005 audio recording was leaked during the 2016 presidential campaign. Trump was recorded bragging that a celebrity like himself "can do anything" to women, including "just start kissing them... I don't even wait" and "grab 'em by the pussy". Trump subsequently characterized those comments as "locker room talk" and denied actually behaving that way toward women, and he also apologized for the crude language. Many of his accusers stated that Trump's denials provoked them into going public with their allegations.

Another type of accusation was made, primarily after the audio recording surfaced, by several former Miss USA and Miss Teen USA contestants, who accused Trump of entering the dressing rooms of beauty pageant contestants. Trump, who owned the Miss Universe franchise, which includes both pageants, was accused of going into dressing rooms in 1997, 2000, 2001, and 2006, while contestants were in various stages of undress. Trump had already referred to this practice during a 2005 interview on The Howard Stern Show, saying he could "get away with things like that" because he owned the beauty pageants in which the women and girls were competing.

In June 2019, writer E. Jean Carroll alleged in New York magazine that Trump raped her in a department store dressing room in 1995 or 1996. The magazine said two friends of Carroll confirmed that Carroll had previously confided in them in regard to the incident. Trump called the allegation fiction and denied ever meeting Carroll, although New York had published a photo of Trump and Carroll together in 1987. In October 2019, the book All the President's Women: Donald Trump and the Making of a Predator by Barry Levine and Monique El-Faizy was published, containing 43 additional allegations of sexual misconduct against Trump.

Trump has denied all the allegations against him, saying he has been the victim of media bias, conspiracies, and a political smear campaign. In October 2016, Trump publicly vowed to sue all the women who have made allegations of sexual misconduct against him, as well as The New York Times for publishing the allegations, but he has yet to follow through with any legal action.

Accusations filed in court against Trump

Ivana Trump (1989)

Ivana Trump and Donald Trump married in 1977. Ivana stated in a deposition taken in 1989, during their divorce proceedings, that Donald had visited her plastic surgeon following which he had expressed anger and ripped out hair from her scalp. Donald said the allegation was "obviously false". The book Lost Tycoon: The Many Lives of Donald Trump (1993), by Harry Hurt III, described the alleged attack as a "violent assault" during which Donald attacked Ivana sexually. According to the book, Ivana later confided to some of her friends that Donald had raped her. In a statement given just before the publication of Hurt's book, and included in the book, Ivana said:

The Trumps' divorce was granted in December 1990 on grounds that Donald's treatment of Ivana, including his affair with Marla Maples, was "cruel and inhuman". According to Donald Trump's lawyer, Jay Goldberg, this was based on Trump's having been seen in public with Marla Maples in 1990. Their settlement had a confidentiality clause preventing Ivana from discussing the marriage or the divorce. In 1992, Trump sued Ivana for not honoring a gag clause in their divorce agreement by disclosing facts about him in her best-selling book, and Trump won a gag order.

Years later, Ivana said she and Donald "are the best of friends". In a July 2015 campaign endorsement, Ivana said: "I have recently read some comments attributed to me from nearly 30 years ago at a time of very high tension during my divorce from Donald. The story is totally without merit."

Jill Harth (1992)
Jill Harth alleged that Trump assaulted her several times. Harth has stated that in December 1992, while dining with Trump and her then-boyfriend George Houraney, Trump attempted to put his hands between her legs. Harth and Houraney visited Trump's Mar-a-Lago estate in Florida in January 1993 for a contract-signing celebration. Trump, according to Harth, offered her a tour before pulling her into the empty bedroom of his daughter Ivanka. "I was admiring the decoration, and next thing I know he's pushing me against a wall and has his hands all over me. He was trying to kiss me. I was freaking out." Harth says she desperately protested against Trump's advances and eventually managed to run out of the room. She and her boyfriend left rather than stay the night, as they had intended. After she became engaged, Harth alleges, Trump began to stalk her.

Harth filed a lawsuit in 1997 in which she accused Trump of non-consensual groping of her body, among them her "intimate private parts", and "relentless" sexual harassment. The suit was withdrawn after Houraney settled with Trump for an undisclosed amount in a lawsuit that claimed Trump had backed out of a business deal. She still claims to have been sexually assaulted and although he was never violent with her, she says his actions were "unwanted and aggressive, very sexually aggressive".

Following the incident, Harth said she received "a couple years of therapy". In 2015, she contacted Trump's campaign to get a job as a makeup artist and sell her men's cosmetic product line. She later said, "Yes, I had moved on but had not forgotten the pain [Trump] brought into my life. I was older, wiser. Trump was married to Melania and I had hoped he was a changed man." She worked at one of Trump's rallies as a makeup artist. Of the experience, she said: "I'm a makeup artist. The guy is a mess, OK? He really needed my services, and I'm a makeup artist that needs a job. Why would, if I was on friendly terms, why wouldn't I try to get that job?"

Harth's lawsuit was first published in February 2016 by LawNewz.com. Her case was first published in May 2016 in The New York Times article "Crossing the Line". Trump characterized her story in the Times as "false, malicious and libelous" and he "strongly denies the claims". Harth stood by her charges in a July 2016 interview with The Guardian. In October 2016, she said that, if sued by Trump, she intends to counter-sue.

E. Jean Carroll (1995 or 1996)

On November 4, 2019, writer E. Jean Carroll filed a lawsuit against Trump, accusing him of defamation by claiming she lied about him raping her in 1995 or 1996. The author, who had first publicly disclosed the alleged sexual assault by Trump in June, said Trump's reaction to the accusation has directly harmed her career and reputation. Carroll said she was filing this lawsuit on behalf of each woman who has faced harassment, assault, or belittlement. Furthermore, Trump has stated that her allegation was just a promotion strategy for her book titled What Do We Need Men For? A Modest Proposal, where she discloses details about the alleged assault. The White House Press Secretary responded to the lawsuit claiming it was "frivolous" and that the story was fake, "just like the author".

In September 2020, the Justice Department filed a court motion seeking to take over Trump's defense, arguing he had acted "within the scope" of the presidency when he called Carroll a liar. The Justice Department also moved the case to a federal court from a state court which the previous month had denied a motion by Trump's attorney to delay the case, which was about to enter the discovery phase. During discovery, Trump could be required to provide a deposition, as well as a DNA sample to compare to genetic material purportedly found on the dress Carroll says she was wearing during the alleged sexual assault. Attorney general Bill Barr asserted the move was a routine application of the Westfall Act that permits the Justice Department to defend federal employees against civil liability for acts conducted in the normal course of their duties. Barr stated the White House had requested the Justice Department action and noted that taxpayers would pay any judgment should Carroll win the case. The next month, the Justice Department asserted in a court filing that the president should not be held liable in a personal suit because he spoke in his official capacity as president, an argument thatif accepted by the courtwould have the practical effect of dismissing the suit because government employees largely enjoy immunity from defamation suits. On October 27, federal judge Lewis Kaplan rejected the Justice Department attempt to intervene in the case, ruling the suit could proceed on the basis of Trump's actions as a private citizen. Kaplan stated that the Justice Department improperly considered the president an officer of a federal agency rather than a constitutional officer. On November 20, Kaplan ordered Trump's prior private attorneys to resume representing him in the case. On November 25, the Department of Justice filed an appeal of Judge Kaplan's ruling in the United States Court of Appeals for the Second Circuit. According to Reuters, "It is unclear whether the justice department will pursue the case on Trump's behalf after the inauguration on 20 January of Joe Biden, the Democrat who defeated Trump, a Republican, in the November presidential election." In June 2021, the Justice Department — then under the Biden administration — argued in a court brief that it should substitute itself as the defendant in the case because Trump had acted as a federal employee.

Summer Zervos (2007)
Summer Zervos was a contestant on the fifth season of The Apprentice, which filmed in 2005 and aired in 2006. Subsequently, she contacted Trump in 2007, about a job after the show's completion, and he invited her to meet him at The Beverly Hills Hotel. Zervos has said that Trump was sexually suggestive during their meeting, kissing her open-mouthed, groping her breasts, and thrusting his genitals on her. She also has said that his behavior was aggressive and not consensual. Zervos was represented by attorney Gloria Allred, and later by Beth Wilkinson and Moira Penza, with whom she chose to end the case in 2021.

John Barry, her cousin and a Trump supporter, has said Zervos talked to her family and friends about Trump, promoting his candidacy and stating how Trump had helped her out in her life. Barry said that during the presidential primary campaign, Zervos invited Trump to her restaurant, and he declined. In October 2016, the Trump presidential campaign released an email by Zervos, sent to Trump's secretary in April 2016, in which she stated: "I would greatly appreciate reconnecting at this time. He will know my intentions are genuine." Zervos said she had intended to confront Trump and give him the "opportunity to clear the air". On April 21, she sent another email to Trump's assistant which she asked to be forwarded to Trump, in which she stated: "I have been incredibly hurt by our previous interaction."

On January 17, 2017, Zervos filed a defamation lawsuit against Trump, arising from his statement that she had lied about the allegations. Marc Kasowitz is defending Trump in the case. Zervos has filed a subpoena for "all documents concerning any woman who asserted that Donald J. Trump touched her inappropriately". On March 21, 2018, a New York Supreme Court judge decided to allow a defamation lawsuit against the President to go forward. On June 4, 2018, Manhattan Supreme Court Justice Jennifer Schecter ruled that Trump must be deposed by January 31, 2019.

, Trump was to provide written answers under oath in the defamation lawsuit.

On March 14, 2019, a New York appeals court rejected President Trump's argument that the Constitution makes him immune from state lawsuits, clearing the way for a defamation suit. On November 2, 2019, Trump agreed to submit to questioning under oath by January 31, 2020.

In January 2020, a New York intermediate appellate court put the defamation lawsuit on hold, until a New York court of appeals could decide the fate of the case. The case hold meant that the January 31, 2020, deadline for Trump to testify was also put on hold.

In February 2021, following Trump's defeat in the 2020 U.S. presidential election, Zervos refiled the lawsuit, arguing that Trump can no longer make the legal argument that presidential immunity protects him from litigation, as he is no longer president. On March 30, 2021, the New York state Court of Appeals ruled in her favor. Trump was instructed to provide a deposition by December 23, 2021. On November 12, Zervos withdrew from the case. Her attorneys said that Trump did not pay her to withdraw and that she "has secured the right to speak freely about her experience".

Alva Johnson (2019)

On February 25, 2019, Alva Johnson filed a lawsuit against Trump, alleging he had forcibly kissed her at a rally in Florida in August 2016 while she was working on his 2016 presidential campaign. Johnson said two people—including Pam Bondi, then the attorney general of Florida—saw the kiss, but both denied seeing it. According to an interview with Teen Vogue, Johnson decided to stop working for the Trump campaign after the media started covering the Access Hollywood tape. She declared sick days until she could speak to a lawyer. In addition to the "unwanted sexual attention", the lawsuit also alleges that Johnson was "a victim of race and gender discrimination through unequal pay". In response, White House press secretary Sarah Huckabee Sanders called the lawsuit "absurd on its face".

On June 14, 2019, the trial court dismissed the complaint without prejudice to allow Johnson to plead a count for battery without any descriptions of Trump's other alleged acts of sexual battery, and to provide necessary details regarding claims of discrimination. On September 4, 2019, Johnson filed a notice that she was not filing an amended complaint, ending the lawsuit.  Johnson decided to drop the lawsuit because she was "facing a judge who openly questions whether the kiss is worthy of a federal lawsuit and has determined that Mr. Trump's history of such behavior is not relevant, and I've endured ongoing threats to my safety."

The New York Times May 2016 story
In May 2016, The New York Times published the article "Crossing the Line: How Donald Trump Behaved with Women in Private". For the article, Times reporters Michael Barbaro and Megan Twohey conducted 50 interviews with women who had known Trump socially, during their professional career, or while modeling or competing for a beauty pageant title.

Other women interviewed for the story, a few of whom had worked for Trump, stated they had not received unwanted advances and "they had never known Mr. Trump to objectify women or treat them with disrespect." Jill Martin, a vice president and assistant counsel at the company, said Trump was supportive of her and her role as a mother. Laura Kirilova Chukanov, a Bulgarian immigrant and 2009 Miss USA pageant contestant, said Trump helped her make connections for a documentary she was working on about her home country.

Rowanne Brewer Lane, Trump's former girlfriend, was quoted at length in the article and was featured in the opening anecdote. Following the article's publication, Brewer Lane accused The New York Times of taking her quotes out of context and said she was "flattered" and not insulted by Trump. Trump spokesperson Barry Bennett responded to the story by stating: "They talked to 50 women and managed to put seven or eight in the story. Over half of them had great things to say. The one that had great things to say, they twisted it and called her debased which is not how she feels." The New York Times defended the story and said Brewer Lane was "quoted fairly, accurately and at length".

Recording controversy and second 2016 presidential debate

Two days before the second 2016 presidential debate, the 2005 Access Hollywood tape was released, which records Trump's having "an extremely lewd conversation about women" in which he described being able to kiss and grope women because he was "a star": "You know I'm automatically attracted to beautiful—I just start kissing them. It's like a magnet. Just kiss. I don't even wait. And when you're a star, they let you do it, you can do anything... grab them by the pussy. You can do anything." Many attorneys and media commentators have said Trump's statements described sexual assault.

On October 7, Trump released a video statement in which he stated, "I said it, I was wrong, and I apologize." He called the development a distraction and attempted to deflect attention to the Clintons, and in particular sexual assault scandals involving Bill Clinton. Republican critics called on him to withdraw from the presidential race.

During the second debate, Anderson Cooper asked Trump if he understood that he had bragged about sexually assaulting women. Cooper used the Justice Department's sexual assault definition to include "any type of sexual contact or behavior that occurs without the explicit consent of the recipient". Trump denied having said that he had sexually assaulted women. He claimed the comments were merely "locker room talk", then, after being asked three times whether he had ever kissed or groped any person without consent, he said "no I have not". Several of his subsequent accusers said this was the moment at which they were motivated to come forward.

Public allegations since 2016

Jessica Leeds (1980s)
In the early 1980s, Leeds was a businesswoman at a paper company on a flight from the Midwest, returning to New York. A flight attendant offered her an empty seat in the first-class cabin next to Trump. Leeds alleged that about 45 minutes after takeoff, Trump lifted the armrest and began touching her, grabbing her breasts, and tried to put his hand up her skirt. "He was like an octopus," she said. "His hands were everywhere. It was an assault." Leeds said she had sent a letter containing her allegations to the editor of The New York Times. Her story was printed by The New York Times in October 2016, along with the account from Rachel Crooks.

Trump spokesman Jason Miller responded to the allegation calling it "fiction". Miller stated the charges were politically motivated "for this to only become public decades later in the final month of a campaign for president should say it all." Trump publicly threatened to sue the Times over the newspaper's publication of the allegation, and demanded a retraction. The Times rejected Trump's retraction demand, and Trump never followed through on his threat to take legal action against the company. An alleged witness to the case who claimed he saw "nothing untoward" upon the flight was former British Conservative county councillor from Gloucestershire, Anthony Gilberthorpe. Gilberthorpe has previously made false allegations against politicians.

Kristin Anderson (1990s)
On October 14, 2016, The Washington Post reported an allegation by Kristin Anderson. Anderson said that Trump groped her beneath her skirt in a Manhattan nightclub in the early 1990s. An aspiring model at the time of the alleged incident, Anderson told the story to her friends, and decided to come forward after reading accounts of other women who had done so. Anderson believed the alleged assault occurred at the China Club, a Manhattan nightclub that Newsday referred to as "Donald's Monday-night nest" due to his alleged habit of picking up women there.

Lisa Boyne (1996)
On October 13, 2016, The Huffington Post reported an allegation by Lisa Boyne. Boyne said Sonja Morgan (then Sonja Tremont) invited her to a dinner with Trump, modeling agent John Casablancas, and five or six models. Boyne alleged that Trump made the models walk across the table, looked under their skirts, and described if they were wearing underwear. Morgan told The Huffington Post that the dinner took place with those participants, did not recall lewd behaviour by Trump, and said: "But I have been known to dance on tables." Boyne said she called her roommate Karen Beatrice that night to inform her about the incident. The Huffington Post contacted Beatrice, who denied any such call.

Cathy Heller (1997)
On October 15, 2016, The Guardian reported an allegation by Cathy Heller that she was grabbed and kissed by Donald Trump two decades earlier. Heller said that, in 1997, she met Trump when she attended a Mother's Day brunch with her children, her husband, and her husband's parents at his Mar-a-Lago estate. Her parents-in-law were members of Mar-a-Lago. Heller was introduced to Trump, who became angry when she avoided a kiss. He then "grabbed" her and, when he tried to kiss her, she turned her head. Trump kissed her on the side of the mouth "for a little too long" and then he left her.

Heller's husband and children, who were present during the event, have corroborated her account. In the summer of 2015, the members of Heller's mahjong group heard Heller's account of the 1997 incident; this was not long after Trump announced his candidacy. She decided to go public after seeing the second presidential debate on October 9, 2016. Heller is a registered Democrat, and public supporter of Hillary Clinton.

Trump campaign spokesperson Jason Miller said Heller's account is "false" and "politically motivated".

Temple Taggart McDowell (1997)
In May 2016, The New York Times reported allegations by Temple Taggart McDowell. McDowell, who was Miss Utah USA in 1997, accused Trump of unwanted kisses and embraces that left McDowell and one of her chaperones so uncomfortable, according to McDowell, that she claimed she was instructed not to be left in a room alone with him again. According to McDowell, a chaperone had accompanied her to Trump's office. At the time, McDowell was 21 and was known as Temple Taggart. This incident occurred in Trump's first year of ownership of the Miss USA contest.

McDowell told her story initially to The New York Times in May 2016 which was published in the "Crossing the Line: How Donald Trump Behaved With Women in Private" article. She had not intended to speak publicly about the incidents again, but she received numerous calls recently due to the "Crossing the Line" article and felt, as a mother, that it is important to share a message about unwanted advances: "You have the right to say no. You have the right to get out of there. You have the right to leave, and you have the right to make them feel uncomfortable if they're making you feel uncomfortable," she said. Trump said he does not know her and denied McDowell's claims. He also told The New York Times he is "reluctant to kiss strangers on the lips".

Taggart McDowell said she is a Republican, and not coming out with the allegation in order to support Hillary Clinton.

Amy Dorris (1997)
Former model Amy Dorris said in September 2020 that she and her boyfriend, Jason Binn, attended the 1997 U.S. Open with Donald Trump, who Binn had described as his best friend. She alleges that Trump groped and kissed her without her consent at the event. The Guardian confirmed that she told her mother and a friend in New York immediately after the incident and that she had told her therapist and several other friends about it over the years; Binn did not reply to The Guardian's request for comment. Trump denied the allegation via his lawyers. Former top model Caron Bernstein stated that her husband was the New York friend and that Dorris had told her about the assault in 2008.

Karena Virginia (1998)
At an October 2016 press conference with attorney Gloria Allred, yoga instructor and life coach Karena Virginia said that in 1998 Trump grabbed her arm and touched her breast. Virginia, who was 27 years old at the time, was waiting for a ride after the US Open in Queens, New York. She said Trump, whom she had not met previously, approached her with a small group of other men, while commenting on her legs, then he grabbed her right arm. Virginia continued, "Then his hand touched the right side of my breast. I was in shock. I flinched. 'Don't you know who I am? Don't you know who I am?'—that's what he said to me. I felt intimidated and I felt powerless."

Trump campaign spokesperson Jessica Ditto responded to the allegation with a statement reading in part, "Discredited political operative Gloria Allred, in another coordinated, publicity seeking attack with the Clinton campaign, will stop at nothing to smear Mr. Trump."

Karen Johnson (early 2000s)
In Barry Levine and Monique El-Faizy's book All the President's Women: Donald Trump and the Making of a Predator, Karen Johnson alleged that she attended a New Year's Eve party at Trump's Mar-a-Lago estate, where Trump grabbed her by her genitals, pulled her behind a tapestry, and forcibly kissed her. Johnson also alleged that days after the incident, Trump repeatedly called her (without her giving him the phone number), offering to fly her to meet him, which she rejected. The book states that Johnson told a friend about the incident years before Trump ran for president.

Mindy McGillivray (2003)
In an October 2016 article by The Palm Beach Post, Mindy McGillivray stated that in January 2003, when she was 23 years old, she was groped by Trump at his Mar-a-Lago estate. She said, "All of a sudden I felt a grab, a little nudge. I think it's [my friend Ken Davidoff's] camera bag, that was my first instinct. I turn around and there's Donald. He sort of looked away quickly." Ken Davidoff, a photographer, corroborated McGillivray's account, saying he remembered her pulling him aside moments after the alleged incident to say "Donald just grabbed my ass!"

McGillivray said she "chose to stay quiet" and never reported the incident to authorities. She had shared details of the incident only with close family and friends until she heard Trump deny such behavior during the second presidential debate on October 9, 2016. Hope Hicks, Trump's press secretary, said McGillivray's allegations lacked "any merit or veracity" and were untruthful.

Ken Davidoff's brother, Darryl Davidoff, said he was also present at the time at Mar-a-Lago and that in his opinion McGillivray is lying. According to Darryl: "I do not believe it really happened. Nobody saw it happen and she just wanted to be in the limelight."

Rachel Crooks (2005)
In 2005, Rachel Crooks was a 22-year-old receptionist at Bayrock Group, a real estate investment and development company in Trump Tower in Manhattan. She says she encountered Trump in an elevator in the building one morning and turned to introduce herself. They shook hands, but Trump would not let go. Instead, he began kissing her cheeks, then directly on the mouth. "It was so inappropriate," Crooks recalled in an interview. "I was so upset that he thought I was so insignificant that he could do that." Her story was printed by The New York Times in October 2016, along with that of Jessica Leeds. Trump has disputed Crooks' claims, writing on Twitter, "Who would do this in a public space with live security cameras running?" Crooks is a public supporter and donor to Hillary Clinton's presidential campaign.

Natasha Stoynoff (2005)
Canadian author and journalist Natasha Stoynoff, who wrote for People magazine and, previously, the Toronto Star and Toronto Sun, went to Trump's Florida estate in December 2005 to interview him and his wife, Melania. While there, Trump gave Stoynoff a tour of the Mar-a-Lago estate. She says that during this tour, he pushed her against a wall and forced his tongue into her mouth.

Stoynoff described the alleged episode, "We walked into that room alone, and Trump shut the door behind us. I turned around, and within seconds he was pushing me against the wall and forcing his tongue down my throat... I was stunned. And I was grateful when Trump's longtime butler burst into the room a minute later, as I tried to unpin myself." Stoynoff composed herself and conducted the interview, after which she said Trump repeatedly told her, "We're going to have an affair, I'm telling you." Melania was also interviewed for that article.

Trump sent out a tweet on October 13, 2016, in which he said it had not happened and wondered why she had not mentioned the event in her People article of 2005. Stoynoff responded that she had become angry when Trump denied assaulting women during the presidential debate and was triggered by the release of the Access Hollywood recording in early October. Until that point, she said, she had conflicting emotions common among victims of assault, combined with embarrassment and confusion. J.D. Heyman, Peoples deputy editor, said: "It was disorienting for her. She felt a great deal of worry and distress about it. Then she felt angry."

That same day, Melania's lawyer demanded an apology from People magazine, stating that Melania did not say some or all of what was quoted in the People article by Stoynoff published on October 12, 2016; Melania specifically denied Stoynoff's claim that she'd run into her on Fifth Avenue following the article's publication. In an interview with Anderson Cooper that aired October 17 on CNN, Melania again denied having crossed paths with Stoynoff on Fifth Avenue, as stated in Stoynoff's article. The following day, People published the account of Liza Herz. Herz said she witnessed the sidewalk encounter between Stoynoff and Melania Trump; Herz' account corroborated that of Stoynoff.

On October 18, People produced six corroborating witnesses who said Stoynoff had recounted the incident to them around the time it occurred. The six witnesses were: "two editors from People, Mary Green and Liz McNeil; a professor of journalism, Paul McLaughlin; a co-worker; and two personal friends of Ms. Stoynoff".

Trump's former butler at Mar-a-Lago resort in Florida, Anthony Senecal, 85, was asked about the 2005 incident in which Stoynoff alleged that the butler had "burst in" on Trump while she was pinned down by him; Senecal denied it ever happened, stating that as a butler "I don't burst in. I knock, then I go in, usually after someone says 'come in'," further alleging "And when I went in, there was nothing strange about where she was standing." According to Senecal, the alleged incident took place in an old massage room with windows all around which made it unsuitable to grope anyone since there was no privacy.

Juliet Huddy (2005 or 2006)
In early December 2017, the reporter Juliet Huddy said Trump kissed her on the lips while they were on an elevator in Trump Tower with Trump's security guard in 2005 or 2006. Regarding this incident, Huddy said "I was surprised that he went for the lips. But I didn't feel threatened... Whatever, everything was fine. It was a weird moment. He never tried anything after that, and I was never alone with him."

Jessica Drake (2006)
On October 22, 2016, Jessica Drake and attorney Gloria Allred held a news conference in which Drake accused Trump of having sexually assaulted her by grabbing tightly in a hug and kissed her and two acquaintances nearly ten years prior. Drake, an adult film actress and sex education advocate, said she met Trump at her company's booth during a charity golf tournament at Lake Tahoe in 2006. Drake claims she was invited to meet with Trump, who was married at the time, at his hotel suite; she was "uncomfortable going alone" and brought two friends. Describing the meeting with Trump, Drake recounted that "He grabbed each of us tightly, in a hug and kissed each one of us without asking permission." Drake said she and her friends left the suite after 30–45 minutes. Shortly thereafter, Drake claims she received phone calls from Trump or his associate, requesting that she join him in his suite for $10,000, and offering to fly her on his jet back to Los Angeles. She said she declined his offers.

During the news conference, Drake said, "I am not looking for monetary compensation. I do not need additional fame... I understand that I may be called a liar or an opportunist but I will risk that in order to stand in solidarity with women who share similar accounts." During the news conference, Gloria Allred held up a picture showing Trump and Drake standing together at the time.

In response to Drake's allegations, the Trump campaign stated that her story is "false and ridiculous", that "[t]he picture is one of thousands taken out of respect for people asking to have their picture taken with Mr. Trump" but Trump did not know Drake and "would have no interest in ever knowing her", and that the story was "just another attempt by the Clinton campaign to defame a candidate". Donald Trump appeared to dismiss the significance of the accusation because of Drake's line of work, saying, "Oh, I'm sure she's never been grabbed before."

Ninni Laaksonen (2006)
On October 27, 2016, a local Finnish tabloid, Ilta-Sanomat, reported an allegation by Ninni Laaksonen, Miss Finland 2006. Laaksonen appeared with Trump on the Late Show with David Letterman on July 26, 2006. Laaksonen claims that before they went on the air, Trump grabbed her buttocks. As Laaksonen describes the interaction: "He really grabbed my butt. I don't think anybody saw it but I flinched and thought: "What is happening?" Someone later told Laaksonen that Trump liked her because she looked like his wife, Melania, when she was younger.

Laaksonen revealed her account to a local Finnish tabloid, Ilta-Sanomat, which had contacted her regarding the level of professionalism involved in Donald Trump's handling of his employees within the Miss Universe pageant. The story was published on October 27, 2016.

Cassandra Searles (2013)
In October 2016, Rolling Stone and NPR reported Trump fondled Cassandra Searles, Miss Washington USA of 2013, without her consent during the Miss USA pageant of that year. In June 2016, Searles wrote that Trump invited her to his hotel room. Yahoo!News published an article in June 2016 stating that Searles had made Facebook postings that accused Trump of making unwanted advances. She said he was "continually" groping her buttocks and had asked her to go "to his hotel room". Searles also asserted that Trump had "treated us like cattle". Trump and his campaign have not specifically responded to Searles' allegations.

Pageant dressing room visits
Trump owned the Miss Universe franchise, which includes Miss USA and Miss Teen USA, from 1996 to 2015. In a Howard Stern interview in 2005, he said he made a practice of walking into the contestants' dressing rooms unannounced while the women were undressed:

In that interview, Trump declined to say whether he had slept with any contestants, saying, "It could be a conflict of interest". Stern then imitated a foreign contestant ("Mr. Trump, in my country, we say hello with vagina"), and Trump jokingly responded, "Well, you could also say, as the owner of the pageant, it's your obligation to do that."

Mariah Billado, Victoria Hughes, and three other Miss Teen USA contestants (1997)
Mariah Billado, Miss Vermont Teen USA, is one of five women to mention such a dressing room visit incident in 1997. Billado said of the visit: "I remember putting on my dress really quick, because I was like, 'Oh my god, there's a man in here.' Trump, she recalled, said something like, 'Don't worry, ladies, I've seen it all before.'" Billado recalled talking to Ivanka, Trump's daughter, who responded "Yeah, he does that." Victoria Hughes, Miss New Mexico Teen USA, also said Trump did conduct a dressing room visit, and that the youngest contestant there was 15. The dressing room had 51 contestants, each with their own stations. Eleven girls said they did not see Trump enter the dressing room, though some said it was possible that he had entered while they were somewhere else, or that they didn't notice. Of the 15 former contestants who were interviewed by BuzzFeed News, none alleged Trump said anything sexually explicit or made physical contact in the dressing room, and reportedly "Most of the former contestants were doubtful or dismissed the possibility that Trump violated their changing room privacy."

Allison Bowman, Miss Wisconsin Teen USA, expressed skepticism: "these were teenage girls. If anything inappropriate had gone on, the gossip would have flown." Trump's campaign stated the allegations of his entering the dressing room "have no merit and have already been disproven by many other individuals who were present".

Bridget Sullivan (2000)
In 2000, Bridget Sullivan was Miss New Hampshire USA. As she prepared for a television broadcast, Trump allegedly walked into the dressing room. She told BuzzFeed he was coming to wish the contestants good luck, but they "were all naked". Some contestants that night do not remember his entering while the ladies prepared and other contestants mentioned that they had no negative experiences with Trump. A spokesman for Trump said Sullivan's claims were "totally false".

Tasha Dixon (2001)
Tasha Dixon, Miss Arizona USA 2001, told a CBS affiliate in Los Angeles that in 2001, "[Trump] just came strolling right in. There was no second to put a robe on or any sort of clothing or anything. Some girls were topless, other girls were naked." She said that having been walked in on when the women had little or no clothes put them in a "very physically vulnerable position, and then to have the pressure of the people that work for him telling us to go fawn all over him, go walk up to him, talk to him..." Another contestant, Miss California USA 2009 Carrie Prejean Boller, told the same CBS affiliate it was wrong to paint Trump that way. Trump's response, provided through spokeswoman Jessica Ditto, is that: "These accusations have no merit and have already been disproven by many other individuals who were present," and Ditto adds that she believes there is a political motivation behind the accusation.

Unnamed contestants (2001)

An unnamed Miss USA contestant said that in 2001 Trump walked into her dressing room unannounced while she and another contestant were undressed. She told The Guardian Trump "just barged right in, didn't say anything, stood there and stared at us.... He didn't walk in and say, 'Oh, I'm so sorry, I was looking for someone.' He walked in, he stood and he stared. He was doing it because he knew that he could." Another contestant told The Guardian the contestant had spoken to others of this event at the time.

Samantha Holvey (2006)
On October 14, 2016, Samantha Carol Holvey, Miss North Carolina USA 2006, related that "Trump's conduct was 'creepy' around the women participating but he never made an advance toward her." She also said that before pageant events, Trump had "moved into areas where she and other contestants were getting ready", and that she had "never been around men that were like that". More than a year after Trump was elected president, and after many high-profile men, such as Harvey Weinstein, had lost their jobs because of sexual harassment allegations, Holvey wrote: "You can't work in Hollywood if you're a sexual predator, but you can become the commander-in-chief?" She then related how Trump made her feel very uncomfortable at the 2006 Miss USA pageant: "He eyed me like a piece of meat. I was shocked and disgusted. I have never felt so objectified. I left the meet-and-greet hoping that this would be my one and only encounter with him." She also described how he had come backstage unannounced, with Melania Trump: "I was shocked—again—by this violation of our personal space. What was he doing, coming backstage when we were still getting dressed?"

Other incidents
In 1992, Trump appeared on NBC News' show A Closer Look, hosted by Faith Daniels. During the show, Daniels said Trump (divorced at the time) agreed to make an appearance because: "You kissed me on the lips in front of the paparazzi, and I said, 'That'll cost you. I'm booking you on the show.'" Trump replied that the kiss was "so open and nice", and that he thought Daniels' husband "had his back turned at the time". Trump had invited NBC News to film a party he threw for himself and Jeffrey Epstein at Mar-a-Lago, where they joined various NFL cheerleaders; the kiss incident occurred there. NBC News revealed footage of the party in July 2019, showing Trump, Epstein and the cheerleaders. At one point during the video, Trump grabbed a woman around her waist, pulled her against his body, and patted her buttocks. At another point, Trump appears to tell Epstein: "Look at her, back there... She's hot."

In a 1998 interview with Chris Matthews, two years before his 2000 presidential campaign, Trump said that his history with women could prove to be an issue in the event of a future presidential campaign, saying "Can you imagine how controversial I'd be?...You think about (Bill Clinton) with the women. How about me with the women? Can you imagine?"

A 2002 article in New York magazine quoted Trump talking about Jeffrey Epstein: "I've known Jeff for fifteen years. Terrific guy. He's a lot of fun to be with. It is even said that he likes beautiful women as much as I do, and many of them are on the younger side. No doubt about it, Jeffrey enjoys his social life." In 2008, Epstein plead guilty to charges involving child prostitution. In 2019, he was charged with child sex trafficking; he died in his cell before facing trial.

Reactions

Comparisons to other behavior
Shaun R. Harper, executive director of the Penn Graduate Center for Education, has said that "many men talk like Donald Trump"; objectifying women and saying offensive things about them. He puts Trump in a class of men whose behavior sometimes includes sexual assault and degrading women. The Economist drew similar parallels, pointing to research that objectifying women can make sexual assault more likely. NPR reported that Trump has exhibited questionable behavior in his treatment of women for some time, using offensive language to describe women including Megyn Kelly, Rosie O'Donnell, and former Miss Universe Alicia Machado. Arwa Mahdawi of The Guardian called his past remarks a "masterclass in rape culture", pointing to statements such as "26,000 unreported sexual assaults in the military—only 238 convictions. What did these geniuses expect when they put men and women together?" and "women, you have to treat 'em like shit." On October 13, 2016, a transcript from a 1994 Primetime Live interview was unearthed where Trump states "I tell friends who treat their wives magnificently, get treated like crap in return, 'Be rougher and you'll see a different relationship.'"

Donald Trump's self-assessment

Trump has presented himself as a political martyr in the face of these accusations. He declared "this is a conspiracy against you, the American people", saying "the Washington establishment and the financial and media corporations that fund it exist for only one reason: to protect and enrich itself" and that "the Clinton machine is at the center of this power structure." In his next speech, he said The New York Times reporters are "corporate lobbyists" for minority shareholder Carlos Slim and Hillary Clinton, suggesting Slim's motivation is that he "comes from Mexico". Trump also said the accusers may instead have been motivated by fame or money. He went on to wonder why President Barack Obama had not been accused yet, and denied the Jessica Leeds allegation by saying "she would not be my first choice."

In the third 2016 presidential debate, Trump repeated his claims: "I think they want either fame or her campaign did it and I think it's her campaign." At a speech at Gettysburg outlining his vision for his first 100 days, he repeated his denials and stated "all of these liars will be sued after the election is over." By 2017, however, Trump had not filed suit against any of his accusers.

Trump family
Melania Trump has responded to the allegations by charging Trump's accusers with lying. Melania has insisted her husband is a "gentleman" and claimed that he had become a victim of a conspiracy involving the news media and the Clinton campaign. Melania also advocates that it is important to check the background of these women before confiding in them, as the accusations can be a strategy of the opposition party to defame the President.

Although Ivanka Trump has claimed to be shocked over Trump's 2005 lewd Access Hollywood tapes, calling them "inappropriate and offensive", she has refused directly to address the issue of her father's alleged sexual assault. In contrast, Donald Trump Jr. described the 2005 comments as "a fact of life", and Eric Trump dismissed all allegations of assault as "dirty tricks" from the Clinton campaign.

Trump campaign
Leeds's and Crooks's allegations, published by The New York Times on October 13, were disputed by Trump's campaign as having "no merit or veracity". The campaign alleged that the Times had a vendetta against Trump. The Los Angeles Times stated that they verified the stories with friends and family members of the accusers to ensure that the stories had been relayed to them earlier. The Trump campaign issued this statement through its spokesman Jason Miller:

Trump's campaign staff also stated that the Stoynoff and McGillivray accusations were without merit.

Trump's attorneys
Trump's attorneys demanded a retraction of the Times article and an apology for what they said was a "libelous article"—defamation designed to destroy Trump's run for president. David McCraw, assistant general counsel for the Times, responded on October 13, 2016, to the libel claims from Trump's attorney. He said Trump's reputation is damaged and "could not be further affected" due to his own statements, like those he made on the Howard Stern show. McCraw continues, "it would have been a disservice not just to our readers but to democracy itself to silence [the accusers'] voices." In response to the request to retract the story, McCraw said, "We decline to do so" and that Trump was free to pursue the matter in court.<ref>{{cite news |url=http://time.com/4530428/new-york-times-donald-trump-lawsuit/ |title=Read The New York Times''' Response to Donald Trump's Retraction Demand |author=Reilly, Katie |date=October 13, 2016 |magazine=Time |access-date=October 13, 2016 |archive-url=https://web.archive.org/web/20161014003114/http://time.com/4530428/new-york-times-donald-trump-lawsuit/ |archive-date=October 14, 2016 |url-status=live}}</ref>

Trump's attorney, Michael D. Cohen, has defended Trump by saying the accusers are not women Trump would find to be attractive.

The Trump administration
In October 2017, White House press secretary Sarah Huckabee Sanders was asked if "the official White House position that all of these women are lying", in reference to the sexual harassment claims against Trump by at least 16 women. Sanders replied, "Yeah, we've been clear on that from the beginning, and the president's spoken on it". In November 2017, Trump criticized Senator Al Franken in the wake of sexual misconduct allegations against Franken. This resulted in Sanders describing "a very clear distinction" between the allegations against Trump and Franken: "Franken has admitted wrongdoing and the president hasn't".

In December 2017, after several of Trump's accusers called on Trump to resign, Sanders said, "the president has addressed these accusations directly and denied all of these allegations, [which] took place long before he was elected." Since Americans elected Trump to office "at a decisive election", Sanders said, "we feel like these allegations have been answered through that process."

#WhyWomenDontReport

The hashtag #WhyWomenDontReport started trending on Twitter in response to the Trump campaign's statements that the accusers lack credibility. Many commentators disputed the claim that the timing of the allegations during the presidential campaign has a bearing on how likely the events were. The range of reasons given for why women are reluctant to immediately report sexual assault included fear of reprisals, fear that no one will believe them, the low likelihood of obtaining justice against the assailant, and the traumatic experience of having to be reminded of the event. Liz Plank points out that Trump's accusers are now experiencing all these factors since coming forward. Civil rights lawyer Debra Katz and others point out that high-profile cases tend to encourage victims to speak up, even years later. Tom Tremblay, a police specialist in sexual assault, says: "Victims may wait days, weeks, months, years, decades... When one victim comes forward, it's not at all uncommon to see other victims come forward, who are thinking, 'Well, they came forward; now it's not just my word.'" Susan Dominus, writing for The New York Times Magazine, hopes this backlash against Trump will lead more people to believe women's stories in the future.

Smear allegationsThe Washington Times online opinion editor and Fox News contributor Monica Crowley said in October 2016 that the accusations come across as a "classical political hit job" on Trump. Fox and Friends co-host Ainsley Earhardt said the allegations were "definitely coordinated" and questioned why the media had given more coverage to the allegations than the Podesta emails.

MSNBC host Joe Scarborough said he was not skeptical of the stories, but "I think it's good to be skeptical when you have stories that are 30 years old that come out days before an election." Fox News Media analyst Howard Kurtz wrote in a column that it was "possible to find the allegations troubling while also questioning their timing and whether it's no accident that the women are breaking their silence a month before the election."

Michelle Obama's speech

The day after The New York Times reported the allegations, First Lady Michelle Obama delivered a widely praised speech on women's experiences of sexism and sexually predatory behavior. Chris Cillizza of The Washington Post said the speech "will go down as one of the most important of this political cycle, a moment in which she crystallized the feelings of many women in the wake of the Trump tape".

Michelle Obama had planned to deliver her normal campaign speech, but said during her speech it would have been "dishonest and disingenuous" to do so, as she felt compelled to address Trump's remarks on women. The speech was "a message she'd been seeking to deliver for a long time about Donald Trump's cruel language toward women". In her speech Obama denounced the Trump tape and Trump's alleged advances: "This was a powerful individual speaking freely and openly about sexually predatory behavior, and actually bragging about kissing and groping women... And to make matters worse, it now seems very clear that this isn't an isolated incident." Her speech discussed the history of similar behavior, and the obstacles it places in women's lives, her voice occasionally trembling with emotion:

Public response
A survey conducted by YouGov in October 2016 found that 43 percent of respondents found the allegations to be credible. Republicans were least likely to find the allegations credible, and only 19 percent of Republicans thought sexual assault would disqualify Trump from the presidency. A year after the election, and after the Harvey Weinstein sexual abuse allegations and subsequent Me Too movement, 86 percent of Clinton voters found the allegations credible, while only 6 percent of Trump voters did.

 Other reactions 
In June 2020, the Michigan Journal of Gender & Law  called for a government inquiry into Trump's sexual misconduct, arguing that existing civil litigation and media accounts had not adequately addressed Trump’s sexual misconduct.

In 2021, Andrew Prokop argued in an article for Vox'' that Trump calculated that his populist appeal and cult of personality would make Republican Party elites afraid to cross him, allowing him to weather the allegations. Prokop also suggested that the Republican Party was less inclined to show that they take sexual misconduct allegations seriously.

See also 
 2017–18 United States political sexual scandals
 
 Stormy Daniels–Donald Trump scandal

Explanatory notes

References 

Articles containing video clips
Controversies of the 2016 United States presidential election
Sexual misconduct allegations
October 2016 events in the United States
Federal political sex scandals in the United States
Sexual misconduct allegations
Sexual misconduct allegations